Pañcasīla, derived from Pali or Sanskrit pañca (five) and sīla (principles), spelt Panchsheel in modern Indian languages, may refer to:

 Five precepts, the basic form of Buddhist precepts
 Five Principles of Peaceful Coexistence, enunciated by the People's Republic of China with Indian agreement
 Panchsheel Agreement, an Indian term, now obsolete, for the 1954 Sino-Indian Agreement
 Pancasila (politics), the Indonesian state philosophy